Africa is a 1930 symphonic poem in three movements by American composer William Grant Still. The work, originally scored for chamber orchestra, was first performed in 1930 by French flautist Georges Barrère and, in a full orchestra version, by Howard Hanson on October 24, 1930,  at the Eastman School of Music in Rochester, New York. The work is about twenty-eight minutes long.

Overview
A description of the symphonic poem is as follows:

Movements
The symphonic poem is in three movements as follows:

Reviews
Reviewers, commenting on its premiere performance, noted that the composition was "not as inchoate or as desultory as his Darker America and Journal of a Wanderer," and, according to biographer Catherine Parson Smith, "[the work] quickly became one of his most highly praised compositions".

See also
 List of jazz-influenced classical compositions
 List of symphonic poems

References

Further reading

External links
 

Compositions by William Grant Still
1930 compositions